Colonel William Pierce Tuttle (November 4, 1847 – October 1924) was a financier, entrepreneur, and land owner predominantly in North Dakota for which the town of Tuttle, North Dakota is named.

Biography
Born November 4, 1847 in the town of Rutland, Jefferson County, New York. He was the son of Jeremiah J. Tuttle and Renew Pierce Tuttle.  His early life was spent on the farm. Tuttle was a member of the North Dakota Legislature from Dawson, North Dakota. Tuttle was a candidate for North Dakota's second congressional district for the United States Congress in 1914, but was defeated by George M. Young.

Later in life, Tuttle became a member of the Chicago Board of Trade. He was a principal in the Dakota Land and Townsite Company. He died in 1924 on either October 5 or October 12, the exact date being reported differently, after a year of illness.

Bibliography 
Notes

References

 - Total pages: 394 

1847 births
1924 deaths
People from Jefferson County, New York
Members of the North Dakota House of Representatives
People from Kidder County, North Dakota